Grantorto is a comune (municipality) in the Province of Padua in the Italian region Veneto, located about  northwest of Venice and about  northwest of Padua.

Grantorto borders the following municipalities: Carmignano di Brenta, Fontaniva, Gazzo, Piazzola sul Brenta, San Giorgio in Bosco, San Pietro in Gu.

Demographic evolution

Twin towns
Grantorto is twinned with:

  Fagnano Olona, Italy
  Grottole, Italy

References

Cities and towns in Veneto